This page shows the results of the Gymnastics Competition at the 1987 Pan American Games, held in Indianapolis, USA.

Men's Events

Artistic Gymnastics

Women's Events

Artistic Gymnastics

Rhythmic Gymnastics

Medal table

See also
Pan American Gymnastics Championships
South American Gymnastics Championships
Gymnastics at the 1988 Summer Olympics

References 
 

Events at the 1987 Pan American Games
1987
Gymnastics in Indiana
Pan Am
1987 Panamerican Games